The 1999 Nabisco Dinah Shore was a women's professional golf tournament, held March 25–28 at Mission Hills Country Club in Rancho Mirage, California. This was the 28th edition of the Kraft Nabisco Championship, and the seventeenth as a major championship.

Dottie Pepper, the 1992 champion, won the last of her two major titles, six strokes ahead of runner-up Meg Mallon. Pepper led by three strokes after 54 holes and shot a final round 66 (−6).

Past champions in the field

Source:

Final leaderboard
Sunday, March 28, 1999

Source:

References

External links
Golf Observer leaderboard

Chevron Championship
Golf in California
Nabisco Dinah Shore
Nabisco Dinah Shore
Nabisco Dinah Shore
Nabisco Dinah Shore
Women's sports in California